Jerome Starkey (born 1981, London) is an English journalist, broadcaster and author best known for covering wars and the environment. He challenged US forces over civilian casualties in Afghanistan and was deported from Kenya in 2017 after reporting on state-sponsored corruption and extrajudicial killings.

Early life 
Starkey grew up in London and won an academic scholarship to attend Stowe School in Buckinghamshire.

Career 
After graduating from Newcastle University with a degree in English literature he joined The Sun in 2003 as a graduate trainee.

Afghanistan 
In 2006 he moved to Kabul, Afghanistan to write propaganda for Nato's International Security Assistance Force (Isaf). He served with the Combined Joint Psy-Ops Taskforce (CJPOTF) which produced a fortnightly newspaper called Sada-e Azadi, or Voice of Freedom in Dari. He resigned after six months, complaining that the newspaper was "terrible". Later he wrote in The Times how Sada-e Azadi was sold by the kilogram as scrap before it could reach readers.

Starkey returned to Kabul as a freelance journalist. From 2008 until 2010 he worked for a range of broadcasters and newspapers including Sky News, France 24, The Scotsman and The Independent. At The Independent he led a successful campaign to free a student journalist Sayed Pervez Kambaksh, who had been sentenced to death for blasphemy.

Civilian Casualties 
Starkey claimed that he was black-listed by the military in Afghanistan as a result of his work on civilian casualties.

In 2010 his investigation into a Night Raid on Narang, in Kunar Province, eastern Afghanistan, led NATO's International Security Assistance Force to admit it had killed eight schoolboys by mistake.

The previous year he linked the newly formed Marine Special Operations Command (MASROC) to three of the worst civilian casualty incidents in Afghanistan's recent history including the Granai Airstrike in Bala Balouk, the Azizabad Airstrike in Herat province and the Shinwar Massacre in Nangahar province.

Gardez night raid 
In 2010, together with his colleagues Shoib Najafizada and Jeremy Kelly, Starkey exposed a cover-up by US Special Forces after an operation known as the Raid on Khataba which inspired the Oscar-nominated documentary Dirty Wars.

During the raid, on 12 February 2010, unidentified special forces soldiers killed five innocent people including two pregnant women, a teenage girl engaged to be married and two brothers who worked for the local government in Paktia province in eastern Afghanistan. All of the victims were from the same family. Initially the soldiers said the women were victims of a triple honour killing. They said they discovered the women's bodies "tied up, gagged and killed" and that the dead men were insurgents.

When Starkey challenged Nato's account they accused him of lying. However, four weeks later William H. McRaven, the commander of America's Joint Special Operations Command (JSOC), admitted his soldiers were responsible. McRaven travelled to the family's compound, outside Gardez and offered to sacrifice a sheep outside their door in a ritual act of Nanawatai, to seek their forgiveness.

Close calls 
In 2010, Jerome was nearly killed during an embed with British troops in Helmand Province when an Improvised explosive device (IED) exploded fewer than 10 metres in front of him. The explosion, inside a designated safe area which had recently been cleared by the Royal Engineers, killed Corporal David Barnsdale and injured two others. The British army tried to censor his account on the grounds that it was too graphic. Senior officers, who were not at the scene, claimed the bomb was not inside the safe area.

Kenya 
In 2012 The Times posted Starkey to Nairobi, Kenya and appointed him Africa Correspondent.

He was deported from Nairobi in 2017 as a result of his work. The government of Uhuru Kenyatta gave no official explanation.

Awards 
Starkey won the Frontline Club award for excellence in 2010, and the Kurt Schork memorial prize in 2011.

References 

British war correspondents
British male journalists
The Times people
Living people
1981 births
Alumni of Newcastle University
People educated at Stowe School